Thomas Gage Blake (10 April 1805 – 1895) was an English cricketer. Blake's batting style is unknown, though it is known he fielded as a wicket-keeper. He was born at Midhurst, Sussex.

Blake made his first-class debut for an England XI against Surrey in 1829. The following season he made two first-class appearances for Suffolk, against the Marylebone Cricket Club at Lord's, and against the same opposition at Field Lane, Bury St Edmunds. In that same season he made two first-class appearances for Sussex, with both appearances coming against Surrey at The Burys, Godalming and Midhurst Cricket Ground. In 1832, he made two first-class appearances for the Marylebone Cricket Club, with both appearances coming against the Cambridge Town Club at Chatteris Cricket Ground and Parker's Piece, Cambridge. In total, Blake made seven first-class appearances, scoring 102 runs at an average of 9.27, with a high score of 26. Behind the stumps he took 3 catches and made 5 stumpings.

He died at Bury St Edmunds, Suffolk, in 1895, aged 89 or 90. His nephews, George Fillingham and William Blake, both played first-class cricket.

References

External links
Thomas Blake at ESPNcricinfo
Thomas Blake at CricketArchive

1805 births
1895 deaths
People from Midhurst
English cricketers
Suffolk cricketers
Sussex cricketers
Marylebone Cricket Club cricketers
Wicket-keepers